The first competition weekend of the 2010–11 ISU Speed Skating World Cup was held in the Thialf arena in Heerenveen, Netherlands, from Friday, 12 November, until Sunday, 14 November 2010.

Schedule of events
The schedule of the event is below:

Medal summary

Men's events

Women's events

References

1
Isu World Cup, 2010-11, 1
ISU Speed Skating World Cup, 2010-11, World Cup 1